Ivan Kostadinov Staykov (October 24, 1926 – April 6, 2003) was a Bulgarian cross-country skier who competed in the 1950s.

He was born in Kazanlak and died in Sofia.

He finished 49th in the 18 km event at the 1952 Winter Olympics in Oslo.

External links
18 km Olympic cross country results: 1948-52

1926 births
2003 deaths
Bulgarian male cross-country skiers
Olympic cross-country skiers of Bulgaria
Cross-country skiers at the 1952 Winter Olympics
People from Kazanlak